Mary Acworth Evershed (née Orr; 1 January 1867 Plymouth Hoe, Devon – 25 October 1949, Ewhurst, Surrey) was a British astronomer and scholar. Her work on Dante Alighieri was written under the pen name M.A. Orr.  Although her middle name is increasingly appearing as Ackworth, this is incorrect. She always gave it as Acworth, and it appeared as such in both her obituaries. The one appearing in the Monthly Notices of the Royal Astronomical Society was written by her nephew A. David Thackeray, who presumably would have known. The first appearance of this incorrect version could well have occurred in the proposal of Mary to be a Fellow of the Royal Astronomical Society; the correct spelling appears when she was subsequently elected a Fellow.

Early life
Mary Acworth Orr was born to Lucy Acworth and Andrew Orr on 1 January 1867. Her father was an officer in the Royal Artillery. Mary grew up in Wimborne and South Stoke in Somerset. Mary’s youngest brother was the colonial administrator Charles William James Orr.

When she was 20, Orr travelled abroad with her sisters, and when in Florence (1888–1890) began a study of the works of Dante which led to her lifelong interest in astronomical references in Dante's poems.

Astronomical career
In 1890 Orr moved with her family to Australia. She found there was no good guide to the southern stars, so wrote An Easy Guide to the Southern Stars, with the encouragement of John Tebbutt, the leading astronomer in Australia at the time.

In 1895, she moved back to England and met fellow British astronomer John Evershed when they both participated in an expedition to view a total solar eclipse of 9 August 1896 in Norway Orr subsequently joined the British Astronomical Association (BAA). At this time the BAA enjoyed the membership of intellectual women barred from the (then) all-male Royal Astronomical Society. During this time she became friends with Agnes Clerke and Annie Scott Dill Maunder, both notable for their contributions to historical astronomy.

Orr married Evershed in 1906. Up to this time he had worked as an industrial chemist, with solar physics as a hobby, but in 1906 was offered a post as assistant astronomer at Kodaikanal Observatory in India. Mary and John moved to Kodaikanal (visiting notable astronomical locations in the United States on the way) to allow him to take up the post in 1907. While in India, Mary collected plants from the region, which were ultimately deposited in the British Museum herbarium.

In 1916 Mary was elected to the membership of the Astronomical Society of the Pacific. On the 9 May 1924 as a Fellow of the Royal Astronomical Society. Lastly she directed the BAA’s Historical Section from its inception in 1930 to 1944. Throughout her life, Evershed travelled to numerous solar eclipses, including Norway in 1896, Algiers in 1900, Western Australia in 1922, Yorkshire in 1927, and Greece/Aegean Sea in 1936.

Dante scholarship
Evershed was also greatly interested in poetry, and while she loved Dante's work, she was worried about his cosmography. Her 1914 book Dante and the Early Astronomers helped clarify Dante's science, as accurate as it could be given existing knowledge.

Bibliography
 Two Letters Addressed to the Bishop of Ripon, on Secularism, the Holy Scriptures, and the Geographical Position of the Garden of Eden (1876)
 Easy Guide to Southern Stars (1896)
 Southern Stars: A Guide to the Constellations Visible in the Southern Hemisphere, preface by John Tebbutt, with a miniature star atlas (London, 1896)
 Black Star-Lore. Journal of the British Astronomical Association, vol. 9 (1898), pp.68-70
 Variable Stars of Long Period. Journal of the British Astronomical Association, vol. 15 (1905), pp.129-132
 Dante and Mediaeval Astronomy. The Observatory vol. 34 (1911), p. 440 (as Mr. and Mrs. Evershed)
 Some Types of Prominences Associated with Sun-Spots. Monthly Notices of the Royal Astronomical Society, vol. 73 (1913), p. 422
 The Origin of the Constellations. The Observatory vol. 36 (1913), p. 179
 Dante and the Early Astronomers. Gall & Inglis (1914)
 The Sea-goat. The Observatory vol. 37 (1914), p. 322
 Stars of the Southern Skies. Longmans, Green & Co. (1915)
 Mem. Kod. Obsc., V.1, Pt.2 (1917) (as Mr. and Mrs. Evershed)
 Recent Work at Arcetri. The Observatory vol. 58 (1932), p. 254 (as Mr. and Mrs. Evershed)
 Arab Astronomy. The Observatory vol. 58 (1935), p. 237
 Who's Who in the Moon. Memoirs of the British Astronomical Association vol. 34 (1938), pt. 1, pp. 1-130. (an index to named lunar craters)

Awards and honours
 1924 – Fellow of the Royal Astronomical Society
 1971 - The minor planet 12628 Ackworthorr is discovered and named after Evershed.

References

Further reading

 Mary T. Brück, "Mary Ackworth Evershed née Orr (1867–1949), solar physicist and Dante scholar", Journal of Astronomical History and Heritage (ISSN 1440-2807), Vol. 1, No. 1, p. 45–59 (1998).
 Mary T. Brück, "Mary Ackworth Orr Evershed", The Biographical Encyclopedia of Astronomers, v.5, pp. 351–352.
 Tracy Daugherty, "Passion for Poetry and Stars Drove 'Dante's Astronomer'", Oregon State University, Spring 2009.
 Tracy Daugherty, "Dante and the Early Astronomer", Yale University Press, 2019

1867 births
1949 deaths
19th-century British astronomers
Dante scholars
20th-century British astronomers
Historians of astronomy
Women astronomers